Nation is a station of the Paris Métro and Île-de-France's RER commuter rail service. It serves Line 1, Line 2, Line 6 and Line 9 of the Paris Métro and RER A. It takes its name from its location at the Place de la Nation.

Location
The station is under and around Place de la Nation – each stopping point oriented along an east–west axis.

The station of line 1 is in a curve, under the southern part of the square, enclosed between the loop stations of lines 2 and 6.

The terminus of line 2 forms a loop under the square. The arrival on the loop is under Avenue de Taillebourg, and the departure under Avenue du Trône, Place des Antilles and Boulevard de Charonne. The station is located southwest of the loop and has two tracks framing a large central platform.

The terminus of line 6 also forms a loop, with the arrival under Avenue du Bel-Air and the departure under Avenue Dorian, Rue de Picpus and Avenue de Saint-Mandé. The trains run along the loop during peak hours but turn back towards Avenue du Bel-Air during off-peak hours (the Dorian-Picpus tunnel then serving as a garage).

The station of line 9, also in a curve, is set lower than the others, under the northern part of the square, between Boulevard Voltaire and Avenue de Taillebourg.

History
The station serves as the eastern terminus of both Paris Métro Line 2 and Paris Métro Line 6. The Line 1 station opened as part of the first stage of the line between Porte de Vincennes and Porte Maillot on 19 July 1900. The Line 2 platforms opened when the line was extended from Bagnolet (now Alexandre Dumas) on 2 April 1903.  The Line 6 platforms opened when the line was extended from Place d'Italie to Nation on 1 March 1909. The Line 9 platforms opened when the first stage of the line was extended from Richelieu – Drouot to Porte de Montreuil on 10 December 1933. On 12 December 1969, the RER station was opened as a new Paris terminus for the Ligne de Vincennes, replacing the old Gare de La Bastille. On 8 December 1977 the central section of line A opened from Nation to Auber.

It is named after the Place de la Nation, named in honour of Bastille Day in 1880. Previously it was called the Place du Trône, where guillotines were set up during the French Revolution.

From the 1960s to 2010, the decorative style Mouton-Duvernet was applied to the platforms of lines 2, 6 and 9 with some specificities. The tiles of line 6 have particular patterns, while those of lines 2 and 9 are bevelled and in two shades of orange, colour randomly distributed on the walls and the tympans. The lighting strips are fitted with metal blades on line 2, while they are typical of the Mouton style on lines 6 and 9. On the latter, the name of the station is written in capital letters on projecting backlit panels, while the 'shell' seats, characteristic of the Motte style, are white. This stopping point is the only one to have lost its decoration since the renovation of the station, implemented within the framework of the RATP Renouveau du métro program.

In the 1990s, the platforms of line 1 were renovated in red Ouï-dire style.

As part of line 1's automation works, the platforms of this line were raised on the weekend of 12 to 13 September 2009, then fitted with platform doors in April 2011.

In 2019, 8.834,660 travelers entered this station which placed it at the 22nd position of the metro stations for its usage.

Passenger services

Access
This station has six entrances, some of which are shared with the RER. Each leads to the side medians, between the roundabout and the circular path serving the buildings in the square.

 Entrance 1: Avenue du Trône is located at the right of no. 28 at Place de la Nation, at the corner of Avenue du Trône and Avenue du Bel-Air. It has a fixed staircase.
 Entrance 2: Avenue Dorian is located opposite no. 6 at Place de la Nation, at the corner of Rue Jaucourt and Avenue Dorian. Consisting of a fixed staircase, it is adorned with a Guimard entrance, which is the subject of a decree as a historic monument.
 Entrance 3: Boulevard Diderot leads to no. 4 at Place de la Nation, at the corner of Boulevard Diderot and Avenue Dorian. With a fixed staircase, it is also adorned with a Guimard-style entrance and classified as a historic monument.
 Entrance 4: Boulevard Voltaire is located at the right of nos. 1 and 3 of Place de la Nation, at the corner of Rue du Faubourg-Saint-Antoine and Boulevard Voltaire. It has escalators reserved for the exit as well as two fixed staircases. It allows direct access to the RER.
 Entrance 5: Avenue de Taillebourg is located opposite no. 15 at Place de la Nation, at the corner of Avenue de Taillebourg and Avenue du Trône. It has escalators and fixed stairs and allows direct access to the RER.
 Entrance 6: Avenue du Bel-Air leads to no. 24bis at Place de la Nation, at the corner of Avenue du Bel-Air and Rue Fabre-d'Églantine. It consists of an elevator which only gives access to the RER.

Station layout

Platforms
The station of line 1, in curve, is of standard configuration. It has two platforms separated by the tracks of the metro and the vault is elliptical. The decoration is red  Ouï-dire style. The lighting canopies, of the same color, are supported by a curved support in the shape of a scythe. The direct lighting is white while the indirect lighting, projected on the vault, is multicolored. The white ceramic tiles are flat and cover the walls, the vault (diagonally), the tympans and some of the hallways. The advertising frames are white and cylindrical and the platforms are fitted with silver sit-stand benches as well as platform screen doors.

The station of line 2, also in a curve, is equipped with a central platform framed by two tracks, with the southern one being bordered by a 'dead platform' protected by a fence and partially used as a connecting passage, which connects with the platform in the direction of La Défense station from the line 1 station adjoining it. Established flush with the walls, its ceiling consists of a metal deck, whose beams, silver in color, are supported by vertical walls. The decoration is in the Mouton-Duvernet style, but with an orange beveled tiling on the walls and the outlets of connecting corridors with line 1, a feature that was also found in the station of line 9 before its renovation; in addition, they are aligned horizontally and vertically. The lighting canopies are specific, fitted with metal blades. The advertising frames are also metallic and the 'shell' seats, characteristic of the Motte style, are blue.

The station on line 6, like that on line 2, has two tracks framing an island platform. However, it is the only one that is not curved and the vault is elliptical. The decoration is a particular variation of the Mouton style with two characteristic lighting canopies, walls covered with tiles, with unique patterns on the network, aligned horizontally and vertically, as well as a vault painted white. The surrounds of the staircase hoppers are treated with the same tiling for some or with a flat white tiling also aligned horizontally and vertically for others. The advertising frames are metallic and gray, and the platform is equipped with a few white Motte style seats.

Like that of line 1, the station of line 9 is curved and has a classic layout under an elliptical vault. Its decoration is of the style used for most metro stations. The lighting canopies are white and rounded in the Gaudin style of the revival of the renouveau du métro des années 2000, and the bevelled white ceramic tiles cover the walls, the vault and the tympans. The advertising frames are in white ceramics and the seats, in Akiko style, are green. The western part of the platform, in the direction of Mairie de Montreuil, has the distinction of displaying coats of arms of the two French departments of the Antilles: Guadeloupe and Martinique, thus illustrating the subtitle attributed to the platforms of line 9 only.

For each stopping point, the name of the station is written in Parisine font on enamelled plates.

Other services
The station is connected with line RER A served by the Gare de Nation. This line connects the western and eastern suburbs of Paris.

It is also served:

 by lines 26, 56, 57, 71, 86, 215 and 351 of the RATP Bus Network, the latter being a means of transport to get to Paris Charles-de-Gaulle airport ;
 and, at night, by the N11 line (connecting Pont de Neuilly to Château de Vincennes) of the Noctilien bus network.

Nearby
 Place de la Nation

Culture
The entrance to the metro is the setting for the outcome of Abdellatif Kechiche's film Poetical Refugee.

Future project
Ultimately, the station could be connected to the T3a tram line or the T3b tram line, which would be extended from Porte de Vincennes, which would allow users of these lines to benefit from metro lines 2, 6 and 9 as well as with RER A.

Gallery

See also

List of stations of the Paris Métro
List of stations of the Paris RER

References

Paris Métro stations in the 11th arrondissement of Paris
Railway stations in France opened in 1900
Paris Métro stations in the 12th arrondissement of Paris
Réseau Express Régional stations
Railway stations located underground in France